State Road 549 (SR 549) is a north–south state road in the U.S. state of Florida.  It runs  through the downtown of Winter Haven as 1st Street N, the north–south axis of the city's grid plan.

Route description
The signage of SR 549 begins at its intersection with SR 542 (Central Avenue) in the heart of downtown Winter Haven, near the post office.  1st Street continues southward to SR 540 (Cypress Gardens Boulevard) but is not signed as SR 549.  From Central Avenue, 1st Street heads northward, bypassing the Winter Haven Hospital, skirting Lake Silver, and paralleling U.S. Route 17.  SR 549 terminates at the intersection where SR 544 jogs over; from this intersection, SR 544 heads west as Avenue T NW and eventually Havendale Blvd; and north as Lucerne Park Road.

Major intersections

References

External links

549
549